In Umbral calculus, Bernoulli umbra  is an umbra, a formal symbol, defined by the relation , where  is the index-lowering operator, also known as evaluation operator  and  are Bernoulli numbers, called moments of the umbra. They are related by equality . Along with the Euler umbra, Bernoulli umbra is one of the most important umbras.

The numerators of the terms are given in OEIS A118050 and the denominators are in OEIS A118051.

Exponentiation

Since Bernoulli polynomials is a generalization of Bernoulli numbers, exponentiation of Bernoulli umbra can be expressed via Bernoulli polynomials:

where  is a real or complex number.
This can be further generalized using Hurwitz Zeta function:

From the Riemann functional equation for Zeta function it follows that

Derivative rule

Elementary functions of Bernoulli umbra

As a general rule, the following formula holds for any analytic function :

This allows to derive expressions for elementary functions of Bernoulli umbra.

Particularly,

 

Particularly,

, 
,

Relations between exponential and logarithmic functions

Bernoulli umbra allows to establish relations between exponential, trigonometric and hyperbolic functions on one side and logarithms, inverse trigonometric and inverse hyperbolic functions on the other side in closed form:

References 

Polynomials
Finite differences
Combinatorics
Factorial and binomial topics